Thereus orasus is a species of butterfly of the family Lycaenidae. It occurs in montane habitats from central Mexico (Colima and Veracruz) to those of western Panama (Chiriquí) at elevations from 1,100 to 1,800 meters.

The larvae feed on Struthanthus condensatus.

References

Butterflies described in 1887
Thereus
Butterflies of Central America
Butterflies of North America
Taxa named by Frederick DuCane Godman
Taxa named by Osbert Salvin